Kileh Golan (also Romanized as Kīleh Golān and Keyleh Golān; also known as Kelīleh Galān, Kīlūlān, and Qīlavān) is a village in Amirabad Rural District, Muchesh District, Kamyaran County, Kurdistan Province, Iran. At the 2006 census, its population was 403, in 92 families. The village is populated by Kurds.

References 

Towns and villages in Kamyaran County
Kurdish settlements in Kurdistan Province